The Tyrant  may refer to:

The Tyrant (House), episode of U.S. television series House
The Tyrant, episode of U.S. television series Planet of the Apes

See also
Tyrant (disambiguation)